This is an incomplete list of Statutory Rules of Northern Ireland in 1986.

1-100

 Misuse of Drugs (Northern Ireland) Regulations 1986 S.R. 1986 No. 52

101-200
Mental Health Review Tribunal (Northern Ireland) Rules 1986 S.R. 1986 No. 193

201-300

 Companies (Forms) Regulations (Northern Ireland) 1986 S.R. 1986 No. 287

301-400

 Companies (Unregistered Companies) Regulations (Northern Ireland) 1986 S.R. 1986 No. 305

1986
Statutory rules
Statutory Rules of Northern Ireland
Northern Ireland Statutory Rules